The San Giorgio class consisted of two armored cruisers built for the Royal Italian Navy (Regia Marina) in the first decade of the 20th century. The second ship, was used to evaluate recently invented steam turbines in a large ship and incorporated a number of other technological advances. The ships participated in the Italo-Turkish War of 1911–1912, although  was under repair for most of the war. San Marco supported ground forces in Libya with naval gunfire and helped them to occupy towns in Libya and islands in the Dodecanese. During World War I, the ships' activities were limited by the threat of Austro-Hungarian submarines, although they did bombard Durazzo, Albania in 1918.

San Giorgio spent several years in the Far East and Italian Somaliland after the war and became a training ship in 1931. After a brief deployment to Spain in 1936, she was reconstructed to better serve her role as a training ship. The ship's anti-aircraft armament was augmented when she was deployed to Tobruk, Libya to reinforce the port's defenses after Italy declared war on Britain in May 1940. San Giorgio was scuttled in early 1941 when Allied forces were poised to capture the port. Her wreck was salvaged in 1952, but sank while under tow. San Marco was converted into a target ship in the early 1930s and was found sunk at the end of the war. She was scrapped in 1949.

Design and description

The San Giorgio class was ordered almost immediately after the preceding  ships, and was an improved version of that design. The forecastle was extended to improve seaworthiness, turret armor was increased, habitability was improved and the propulsion machinery was redistributed. San Marco was given the first steam turbines fitted in a large Italian ship for comparative purposes with San Giorgio, which retained the traditional vertical triple-expansion steam engines (VTE). San Marco was a very innovative ship as she was the first turbine-powered ship in any navy to have four propeller shafts, the first with a gyroscopic compass, the first with antiroll tanks, and the first not to use wood in any way.

The ships had a complement of 32 officers and 666 to 673 enlisted men.

Propulsion
The machinery installation of this class was changed in comparison to that of the Pisa class, with the engines amidships with the 14 mixed-firing water-tube boilers fore and aft of the engines. Their exhausts were trunked together into two widely spaced pairs of funnels. San Giorgios two shafts, pair of  VTE steam engines and Blechynden boilers differed only slightly from those used by the Pisas. In contrast, San Marcos four shafts, each driven by a license-built Parsons steam turbine, was a first for the Regia Marina. Both ships exceeded their designed speeds, with San Giorgio reaching  and San Marco  during their sea trials.

Armament
The main armament of the San Giorgio-class ships consisted of four Cannone da 254/45 A Modello 1907 guns in electrically powered, twin-gun turrets fore and aft of the superstructure. The turrets had an arc of fire of 260°. The ships mounted eight Cannone da 190/45 A Modello 1908 in four electrically powered twin-gun turrets, two in each side amidships, as their secondary armament. Their arc of fire was 160°. These Armstrong Whitworth  guns fired

For defense against torpedo boats, the San Giorgios mounted 18 quick-firing (QF) 40-caliber  guns. Eight of these were mounted in embrasures in the sides of the hull and the rest in the superstructure. The ships were also fitted with a pair of QF 40-caliber  guns. The San Giorgio-class ships were equipped with three submerged  torpedo tubes. During World War I, eight of the 76 mm guns were replaced by six 76 mm anti-aircraft (AA) guns and one torpedo tube was removed.

Protection
The 254 mm gun turrets were protected by 200 mm of armour while the 190 mm turrets had .

Ships

Service

San Giorgio ran aground in August 1911 off Naples-Posillipo; heavily damaged, she was under repair until June 1912, missing most of the Italo-Turkish War. San Marco supported the occupations of Benghazi and Derna, Libya during the war and bombarded the fortifications defending the entrance to the Dardanelles. She also supported the forces occupying the island of Rhodes in May 1912. In February 1913, San Giorgio cruised the Aegean Sea and made a port visit to Salonica, Greece, the next month. She ran aground again on 21 November in the Strait of Messina, but was only slightly damaged.

After the war, San Giorgio was deployed to the Far East while San Marcos played a minor role in the Corfu incident in 1923. San Giorgio, escorted by San Marco, ferried Crown Prince Umberto to South America in July–September 1924, and then supported operations in Italian Somaliland in 1925–1926. She was captured by the Germans when they occupied La Spezia on 9 September 1943; San Marcos was found at the end of the war half-sunk in the harbor there and was broken up in 1949.

From 1930 to 1935, San Giorgio was based in Pola as a training ship, and was sent to Spain after the Spanish Civil War began in 1936 to protect Italian interests. Each pair of funnels was trunked together and her 76/40 guns were replaced by  / 47 caliber guns in four twin turrets abreast the funnels. Her torpedo tubes were also removed while she received a light AA suite for the first time, with the addition of six Breda  54-cal. guns, a dozen  Breda Model 35 autocannon and four  Breda Model 31 machine guns in two twin mounts.

Prior to her being sent to reinforce the defenses of Tobruk in early May 1940, a fifth 100/47 gun turret was added on the forecastle and five more twin  machine gun mounts were added to better suit her new role as a floating battery. Two days after Italy declared war on Britain on 10 June, the British light cruisers  and  bombarded Tobruk and attacked San Giorgio, which was not hit during the engagement. A British submarine fired two torpedoes at San Giorgio on 19 June, but these detonated before reaching the ship. The ship's guns engaged Allied aircraft attacking Tobruk many times, destroying several. She was scuttled in shallow water on 22 January 1941 to prevent her capture during the Battle of Tobruk. San Giorgio was awarded the Gold Medal of Military Valour (Medaglia d'Oro al Valore Militare) for her performance at Tobruk. Her wreck was refloated in 1952, but sank under tow en route to Italy.

Footnotes

References

Notes

Bibliography

External links

The San Giorgio class on Maritimequest.com
 San Giorgio (1908) Marina Militare website

 
Cruisers of the Regia Marina

Cruiser classes